Translocation may refer to:

 Chromosomal translocation, a chromosome abnormality caused by rearrangement of parts
 Robertsonian translocation, a chromosomal rearrangement in pairs 13, 14, 15, 21, and 22
 Nonreciprocal translocation, transfer of genes from one chromosome to another
 PEP group translocation, a method used by bacteria for sugar uptake
 Twin-arginine translocation pathway, a protein export pathway found in plants, bacteria, and archaea
 Translocation (botany), transport of nutrients through phloem
 Protein translocation, also called protein targeting, a process in protein biosynthesis
 Species translocation, movement of a species, by people, from one area to another